is a railway station on the Seibu Ikebukuro Line in Nerima, Tokyo, Japan, operated by the private railway operator Seibu Railway.

Lines
Only all-stations "Local" services stop at this station.

Station layout
Nakamurabashi Station consists of an elevated island platform serving two tracks, with an additional outer track on either side for non-stop services.

Platforms

History
The station opened on June 11, 1924.

Station numbering was introduced on all Seibu Railway lines during fiscal 2012, with Nakamurabashi Station becoming "SI07".

Passenger statistics
In fiscal 2013, the station was the 24th busiest on the Seibu network with an average of 38,913 passengers daily.

The passenger figures for previous years are as shown below.

References

External links

 Nakamurabashi Station information (Seibu Railway) 

Railway stations in Japan opened in 1924
Seibu Ikebukuro Line
Railway stations in Tokyo